Perthes is a commune in the Ardennes department and Grand Est region of north-eastern France.

It was the site of a minor skirmish in the First Battle of Champagne, fought on 20 December 1914.

Population

See also
Communes of the Ardennes department

References

Ardennes communes articles needing translation from French Wikipedia
Communes of Ardennes (department)